Syarhey Shastakow (born 19 July 1997) is a Belarusian professional footballer.

References

External links 
 
 Profile at Naftan website

1997 births
Living people
Belarusian footballers
Association football midfielders
FC Naftan Novopolotsk players
People from Polotsk
Sportspeople from Vitebsk Region